Isaac Cox is the name of:

 Isaac N. Cox (1846–1916), U.S. Representative from New York
 Isaac Joslin Cox (1873–1956), American historian